TM is the eighth and final studio album by American boy band Brockhampton. It was released on November 18, 2022, one day after the release of the group's previous studio album The Family, through RCA and Question Everything. For its entire rollout, The Family was advertised as the band's final album. A surprise release, TM was announced for release alongside a promo image for The Family, and was billed by the band as a "parting gift for fans".  During a show after release TM was revealed to be the initials for The Mountain.

Background 
The Family had been advertised as the final studio album from Brockhampton. Despite this, in a promo image posted to social media alongside the release of The Family, the band announced surprise album TM in small text towards the bottom of the image, reading "Surprise album (TM) midnight local."

Recording 
Stated in a press release, TM is "an album made up of songs that were started by the group during a two-week stint in Ojai, California in 2021, but were never fully completed during those sessions." The album is executively produced by Brockhampton member Matt Champion.

Critical reception 

Clash journalist James Mellen called TM "a classic Brockhampton record" that successfully ended the Brockhampton project, featuring "immaculate production, genre shapeshifting, and some of the cleanest verses from the group in quite some time".

Track listing

Samples
 "Listerine" contains excerpts from "Sha Na Na" as performed by El Michels Affair, written by Homer Steinweiss, Leon Michels, and Shannon Wise.
 "Keep It Southern" contains a sample from "Yesu Mahesha", by P. Susheela.
 "Goodbye" contains excerpts from "Goodbye Horses" as performed by Q Lazzarus, written by William Garvey.

Personnel

Brockhampton
 Matt Champion – vocals (1-4, 6-9, 11), production (7), additional drum programming (1), art direction, executive production 
 Kevin Abstract – vocals (1-10)
 Jabari Manwa – vocals (2-4, 9), production (2, 4, 9–11), additional production (3)
 Dom McLennon – vocals (1, 3-4, 10), production (3, 9)
 Joba – vocals (6-11), production (1)
 Merlyn Wood – vocals (4-5), production (5)
 Bearface (credit only)
 Romil Hemnani – production (2–6, 9, 11), recording (1–7, 9–11)
 Kiko Merley – production (1, 3, 5–8), arrangement (7)
 Henock "HK" Sileshi – art direction, graphic design
 Ashlan Grey – photography

Additional musicians
 Ryan Beatty – vocals (2, 6)
 August Royals – additional vocals (6)
 Rich Hinman – slide guitar (7)
 Jay Rudolph – drums (8)
 Sean Matsukawa – guitar (10)
 Brad Lewis – production (2)
 Baird – production (2, 7, 9)
 WilliamVanZandt– production (2)
 Goldwash – production (2)
 Jonah Abraham – production (3, 5–6, 8, 11), synth bass (2, 9)
 Alex Goose – production (3)
 Dutra – production (4)
 Grant Lapointe – production (5), synth (1), keys (6, 8)
 Solomonophonic – production (6), additional production (3)
 John Debold – production (6)
 Coop the Truth – production (8)
 Dylan Neustadter – production (9)
 The Kount – production (9)
 Wesley Allen – production (9)
 Jordon Lumley – additional production (8)

Technical personnel

 Alex Thompson – recording engineer (1)
 Eddie Roberts – recording engineer (1)
 Garry Purohit – recording engineer (1–4, 7, 9, 11)
 Jeremy Simoneaux – recording engineer (8)
 Alex Tumay – mixing
 Andrew Kim – mixing assistant
 Nacor Zuluaga – mixing assistant
 Joe LaPorta – mastering

Charts

References 

2022 albums
RCA Records albums
Brockhampton (band) albums